Del Bonita is a hamlet in southern Alberta, Canada within Cardston County. Del Bonita is a name derived from Spanish meaning "of the pretty".

Demographics 
The population of Del Bonita according to the 2008 municipal census conducted by Cardston County is 6.

Attractions 
Various buildings and artifacts from the Whiskey Gap ghost town have been moved to Del Bonita, including the Whiskey Gap Oil Shed and the Huey Gum Restaurant, Pool Hall and Rooms.

Notable people
 Earl W. Bascom (1906-1995), cowboy, rodeo champion, "father of modern rodeo", inventor, Hollywood actor, cowboy artist and sculptor, worked in Del Bonita in the mid 1920s for the Orgill Ranch and trailed horses to British Columbia for rancher Lamonde "Nick" Carter.

See also 
List of communities in Alberta
List of hamlets in Alberta
List of ghost towns in Alberta

References 

Alberta land ports of entry
Cardston County
Hamlets in Alberta
Latter-day Saint settlements in Canada